After the conquest of Kabul, Babur had imposed a large contribution of horses and sheep on the Sultan Masudi Hazaras and sent collectors to receive it. However, his collectors returned unsuccessful. The Hazaras refused to pay as they did not recognize Babur as their legitimate sovereign.  Several times before they had been guilty of depredations on the roads of Ghazni and Gardez. Babur decided to subdue the Hazaras in what is now Maidan Wardak Province of Afghanistan.

Babur took the field for the purpose of falling on them by surprise and having advanced by way of Maidan Shar he cleared the pass of Nirkh District by night and by the time of Fajr prayers, fell upon the Hazaras in the territory of Chatu and defeated them. He then levied the taxes on them and returned by way of Sang Surakh. Jahangir Mirza II took leave to go to Ghazni while Babur returned to Kabul.

See also
 First Campaign against Turkomen Hazaras

References 
Baburnama - Autobiography of Mughal Emperor Babur
Tarikh-i-Rashidi - A History of the Moghuls of Central Asia

Hazara history
Babur
1505 in Asia
Conflicts in 1505
Battles involving the Hazara people